The Dampilasan River or Dampilasan Creek is a river in the province of Bukidnon, Philippines. It is located in the municipality of Impasugong. It is a tributary of the Pulangi River.

References

Landforms of Bukidnon